Uno Palmström, (9 August 1947 - 27 April 2003) was a Swedish journalist and author. He also wrote the script for two TV-series for SVT.

Bibliography
1976 – Kuppen: thriller (Askild & Kärnekull, 1976)
1978 – System 84 (Askild & Kärnekull, 1978)
1980 – Mördare! Mördare!: (Arbetarkultur, 1980)
1982 – Där kanonen blommar: Arbetarkultur, 1982)
1983 – Slutstation Stockholm (Arbetarkultur, 1983)
1984 – Maratonmannen: en kriminalroman (Arbetarkultur, 1984)
1986 – ... om någon är född eller död (Arbetarkultur, 1986)
1988 – Blåvitt: historien om ett mästarlag, Prisma, 1988)
1989 – Hundarna yla för lik (Arbetarkultur, 1989)
1990 – Bara till graven (Arbetarkultur, 1990)
1992 – Kommissarie Holgersson: Mordisk resa genom Sverige ( Läsförlaget AB, 1992)

TV
1980 – Mördare! Mördare! (SVT)
1985 – Nya Dagbladet (TV-serie) (SVT)

References

1947 births
2003 deaths
Swedish writers